The Shire of Wickepin is a local government area in the Wheatbelt region of Western Australia, east of Narrogin and about  southeast of the state capital, Perth.

History

The Wickepin Road District was established on 19 February 1909. The Road Board consisted of a chairman, secretary and seven members. On 1 July 1961, it became a shire under the Local Government Act 1960, which reformed all remaining road districts into shires.

Wards
The Shire is at present undivided with its nine councillors representing the entire shire.

Until 20 October 2007 the shire was divided into 5 wards:

 Townsite Ward (2 councillors)
 North Ward (2 councillors)
 Central Ward (2 councillors)
 South Ward (2 councillors)
 East Ward (1 councillor)

Towns and localities
The towns and localities of the Shire of Wickepin with population and size figures based on the most recent Australian census:

Population

Heritage-listed places
As of 2023, 213 places are heritage-listed in the Shire of Wickepin, of which one is on the State Register of Heritage Places, the Wickepin Nursing Post.

References

External links

 

Wickepin